Leonardo Matos de Oliveira (born January 7, 1986 in Ibirapuã), commonly known as Léo Bahia, is a Brazilian footballer who plays as a central defender.

External links

1986 births
Living people
Brazilian footballers
Association football defenders
Associação Desportiva São Caetano players
Esporte Clube Vitória players
Marília Atlético Clube players
Esporte Clube São José players
Santa Cruz Futebol Clube players
Clube Atlético Linense players
Centro Sportivo Alagoano players
Grêmio Osasco Audax Esporte Clube players
Sertanense F.C. players
Armenian Premier League players
FC Gandzasar Kapan players
Brazilian expatriate footballers
Brazilian expatriate sportspeople in Portugal
Expatriate footballers in Portugal
Expatriate footballers in Armenia
S.C. Praiense players
Al-Qaisumah FC players
Al-Markhiya SC players
Expatriate footballers in Saudi Arabia
Brazilian expatriate sportspeople in Saudi Arabia
Qatari Second Division players
Expatriate footballers in Kuwait
Brazilian expatriate sportspeople in Kuwait
Al-Sahel SC (Kuwait) players
Riffa SC players
Bahraini Premier League players
Brazilian expatriate sportspeople in Bahrain
Expatriate footballers in Bahrain
Salam Zgharta FC players
Expatriate footballers in Lebanon
Brazilian expatriate sportspeople in Lebanon
Lebanese Premier League players